Marcus Glenroy Richardson (born 31 August 1977) is an English football manager and former professional footballer.

As a player he was a striker who notably played in the Football League for Torquay United, Hartlepool United, Lincoln City and Chester City. He also turned out professionally for Cambridge United, Rochdale, Yeovil Town, Macclesfield Town and Bury. He has played at Non-League level for Burhnam, Slough Town, Weymouth, Crawley Town, Farnborough, Henley Town, Windsor & Eton, Reading Town and Marlow. In 2014 he became player/manager of Highmoor Ibis.

Playing career
Richardson began his career in non-league football. Following a move from Burnham, he made his debut for Slough Town in December 1999. A successful season with Slough alerted league scouts and he spent a week on trial with Cambridge United in July 2000. He moved to Harrow Borough for the start of the 2000–01 season and continued to attract attention from league clubs with appearances for Reading reserves in August 2000 and Wycombe Wanderers reserves in November 2000. He finally broke into the professional ranks by signing for Cambridge United on 16 March 2001, the same day that Dave Kitson also signed for Cambridge. The following day, he scored on his debut, netting a last-minute winner in a 3–2 win away to Stoke City. He moved to Torquay United on loan in September 2001, making the move permanent the following month at a cost of £5,000 for Torquay.

His spell at Torquay began with his as regular, although he was later mainly used as a substitute, competing with the likes of David Graham, Eifion Williams and Tony Bedeau for a place up front. He moved to Hartlepool United in October 2002 and would be joined at Hartlepool by Eifion Williams who had joined seven months earlier. He struggled to settle at Hartlepool, although did score against Torquay in a match almost postponed due to snow, Richardson landing in a pile of cleared snow in front of the Torquay fans during one attempt on goal. He gained cult status among Hartlepool fans and was known as "Tripod" due to his large member.

He had two spells on loan with Lincoln City in the 2003–04 season, before signing for Lincoln on a free transfer in January 2004. He was involved in "training ground incident" with Ciarán Toner early the following year, which resulted in both players being fined and loaned out to other clubs, Richardson joining Rochdale on loan in February 2005.

The following month he joined Yeovil Town on a free transfer, but was released at the end of the season, after just four appearances in which he failed to score. In June 2005 he joined Chester City, where he scored the killer third goal in the club's shock 3–0 FA Cup win over Nottingham Forest in December 2005. However, he only managed a handful of other goals for the club and joined Macclesfield Town on loan in March 2006, scoring twice on the final day of the season at Bristol Rovers to help assure the Silkmen's Football League safety.

He was released by Chester at the end of the 2005–06 season, and in July 2006 joined Weymouth. It was to be yet another nomadic 12-month period for Richardson. He failed to settle at Weymouth and left to rejoin Cambridge United on 21 August 2006 without playing a league game for Weymouth. He departed Cambridge in January 2007, joining Crawley Town. He duly left Crawley in the summer of 2007.

After a successful pre-season trial, he joined Bury on a month-to-month contract in August 2007, linking up with his erstwhile Lincoln City manager Keith Alexander. He played his only league game for the club in a surprise 2–1 win at Milton Keynes Dons on 11 August 2007 but was released at the end of his short-term contract on 31 August 2007.

In October 2007, Marcus joined Farnborough, scoring on his debut against Marlow. After nearly two seasons at the club he was released in the May 2009, following a change in manager.

Richardson signed for Henley Town in August 2009, scoring on his debut in a 6–0 victory over Prestwood on 16 August 2009.

Coaching career
In July 2010, he moved on to join Reading Town where he also formed part of the management team. However, in June 2012, he moved with manager Mark Bartley to Marlow. He helped Marlow gain promotion into the Southern League as Hellenic League Premier Division champions. In January 2014, he returned to the Hellenic League, joining Highmoor Ibis as a player/manager. He resigned from the post in October 2017, before becoming manager at Flackwell Heath the following month. He left Flackwell Heath in October 2021.

References

External links

Unofficial Marcus Richardson Profile at The Forgotten Imp

1977 births
Living people
English footballers
Sportspeople from Reading, Berkshire
Association football forwards
Burnham F.C. players
Slough Town F.C. players
Harrow Borough F.C. players
Cambridge United F.C. players
Torquay United F.C. players
Hartlepool United F.C. players
Lincoln City F.C. players
Rochdale A.F.C. players
Yeovil Town F.C. players
Chester City F.C. players
Macclesfield Town F.C. players
Weymouth F.C. players
Crawley Town F.C. players
Bury F.C. players
Farnborough F.C. players
Henley Town F.C. players
Windsor & Eton F.C. players
Reading Town F.C. players
Marlow F.C. players
Reading City F.C. players
English Football League players
National League (English football) players
Isthmian League players
English football managers
Reading City F.C. managers
Flackwell Heath F.C. managers
Footballers from Berkshire